Åram is a village in Vanylven Municipality in Møre og Romsdal county, Norway.  The village is located on the mainland, about  straight north of the municipal centre of Fiskåbygd.  The village has a ferry quay with regular connections to the nearby islands of Kvamsøya, Voksa, and Gurskøya in the neighboring Sande Municipality.  Åram Church is located in the village.

The local football club is Åram/Vankam FK.

References

Villages in Møre og Romsdal
Vanylven